Aniz Abraão David (Rio de Janeiro, 7 June 1937), better known as Anísio, is an illegal lottery operator (bicheiro) and the honorary president of the samba school Beija-Flor in Nilópolis. He has been the president of the Independent League of Samba Schools of Rio de Janeiro (LIESA) from 1985-1987.

Bicheiro
Anísio controlled the game in Nilópolis and the Baixada Fluminense. He was found guilty by judge Denise Frossard in 1993 of involvement in the Jogo do Bicho, along with 13 other bicho bankers such as Castor de Andrade and Capitão Guimarães. They were found responsible for at least 53 deaths. They were sentenced to six years each, the maximum sentence for racketeering. But in December 1996 they were all back on the streets, granted parole or clemency.

His family has significant political power in Nilópolis. His brother Farid Abraão David was the mayor of the city from 2001 to 2008 and again from 2017 to 2020. One of his nephews, and a cousin, Simão Sessim, served on the Chamber of Deputies.

Fixing the 2007 Carnival
Anísio and other bicheiros Antonio Petrus Kalil, or Turcão, and Capitão Guimarães were among 24 people arrested on April 12, 2007, for alleged involvement with illegal numbers games, bingo parlors and the distribution of slot machines. Raids by the Federal Police have uncovered big payoffs to judges, police officers, prosecutors and lawyers from the bosses who run the game. Mounds of documents have been seized and US$6 million in cash has been confiscated.

One of the charges was that bicheiros fixed the results of Rio de Janeiro's 2007 carnival parade. Press reports suggest that Anísio, the president of Beija-Flor that won the competition, used bribes and a hitman to buy and intimidate members of the carnival jury. According to extracts from a federal police report "some individuals who worked as carnival jurors and refused to accept benefits from Anisio were threatened or had their relatives threatened with death if the Beija-Flor school did not win the 2007 carnival".

New arrest and conviction
He was released while appealing for a habeas corpus, but arrested again on January 11, 2012, for driving while accompanied by an armed security gang. Police were also investigating him for money-laundering. His detention followed a previous failed attempt in which a police helicopter swooped on his penthouse in Copacabana while he was out.

On March 13, 2012, he was sentenced to 48 years in prison and a fine of BRL 11 million (about USD 6 million) for formation of armed gangs, money laundering, smuggling and corruption, together with other bicho bosses Capitão Guimarães and Antônio Petrus Kalil. The sentence was annulled by the Supreme Federal Court, but in December 2012 Anísio, Capitão Guimarães, Kalil and 19 others were again convicted by the Criminal Court in Rio de Janeiro. Anísio was sentenced to 47 years and 9 months for conspiracy and corruption. The judge's sentence said that the bicheiros' criminal organisation had "an intense connection with the state, through the bribing of public officials, including in the police and the judiciary, and even with the political system, through the financing of political campaigns."

References

Bicheiros
Rio Carnival
Living people
1937 births
People convicted of money laundering